Carson Jones (born August 19, 1986) is an American professional boxer at welterweight and the former USBA welterweight champion. He is also the former NABA light-middle weight champion, the former WBC Continental Americas light-middle weight champion (May 7, 2009), and the former NABA USA light middleweight champion. He achieved his highest ranking in May 2012, when he was placed as the #4 rated welterweight in the world by the IBF.

Professional career 2004 to 2009
Jones began his professional career at the age of 18 on October 5, 2004 with a TKO win over Sheldon Mosley. Starting in the light-middle weight division he would go on to earn a record of 23-7-1(15 KOs) by the end of 2009. He credits his early losses to his previous management throwing him in the ring prematurely. For losses, by the end of 2009, his opposition’s combined recorded was 102-19-8. His first lost came by way of unanimous decision to Favio Media (7-1-2) to whom he had previously fought to a draw.

Carson Jones vs Alfonso Gomez

After turning age 20 a little more than two weeks prior, Jones fought Alfonso Gomez at the ARCO Arena in Sacramento, California on August 25, 2006. Throughout the match Gomez aggressively pressured an outmatched Jones, eventually winning a premature and controversial stoppage in the eighth and final round. Jones was clearly unharmed and able to continue defending himself but the referee declared a TKO.

Carson Jones vs. Jesus Soto Karass

On February 6, 2009 Jones fought Jesus Soto Karass at the Maywood Activity Center in Maywood, California. Although Karass scored two knockdowns in the 3rd round, the fight was highly competitive. Karass would win by unanimous decision although being deducted one point for hitting Jones in the back of the head.

Carson Jones vs. Tyrone Brunson

Jones met Tyrone Brunson on December 4, 2009 at the Chumash Casino in Santa Ynez, California. Brunson had scored a record 20 first-round knockouts in his first 21 professional fights but the quality of opposition that he had faced was debatable. By the third round Jones effectively exposed Brunson’s lack of skill by countering with a devastating combo, flooring him for the first time in his career. Jones then aggressively pounded Brunson until earning a stoppage by TKO.

Professional career 2010 – present

Jones changed management in 2009 and by 2010 began routinely fighting as a welterweight. He has amassed a record of 13-2-1 (8 KOs) since 2010 with one loss coming by split decision and the other by majority decision.

Carson Jones vs. Said Ouali

Carson and Said Ouali clashed on September 17, 2011 at the MGM Grand in Las Vegas on the undercard of Floyd Mayweather Jr. vs. Victor Ortiz. After a competitive 7 rounds, Jones stopped Ouali after his right eye became swollen shut. Jones was leading on all the score cards at the time. In addition, Jones scored a knockdown in the 4th round.

Carson Jones vs. Ricardo Williams Jr.

Jones swam through Ricardo Williams Jr. with a fourth-round TKO at Remington Park in Oklahoma City, Oklahoma on December 15, 2011. Williams is best known for his performance in the 2000 Olympic Games which saw him win a Silver Medal as a light welterweight. Nonetheless, Carson’s dominance was convincing as he scored three knockdowns en route to his victory.

Carson Jones vs. Kell Brook

On July 7, 2012 Jones and Kell Brook went to war at the Motorpoint Arena in  Sheffield, Yorkshire, United Kingdom. Billed as the “Edge of Glory” the match was an IBF welterweight title eliminator pairing the undefeated Brook against Jones in his first overseas appearance. Jones adopted a reserved strategy for the first half of the bout allowing his opponent to win all of the first 6 rounds, while gradually landing body blows. Over the second half of the match Carson increased the pressure breaking Brook’s nose, targeting his body, and winning the majority of the final six rounds. Despite this, Brook won a majority decision.

Jones’ determination and drive in the fight impressed many spectators in the UK resulting in him being awarded the 2012 Overseas Fighter of the Year recognition by the British Boxing Board of Control.

Current and previous titles
On April 18, 2008, Jones beat Jose Adelaydo Gonzalez by unanimous decision to win the vacant NABA USA light middleweight title.

On May 7, 2009 Jones convincingly handled Michi Munoz by TKO in round 10 of 12 to win the vacant WBC Continental Americas light middle weight title. He would later vacate the title.

On April 22, 2010 Jones beat Jason LeHoullier by TKO to win the NABA light middleweight title. He would later lose the title to Rogerio Pereira by split decision.

Jones fought veteran boxer Michael Clark on May 5, 2011 at the Crowne Plaza Hotel in Tulsa, Oklahoma. Jones scored a victory after Clark was unable to continue after an accidental low blow in the second round. The TKO loss was the fourth KO loss of Clark’s career and gave Jones the USBA welterweight title. To date, Jones has successfully defended his title twice.

Professional boxing record

| style="text-align:center;" colspan="8"|40 Wins (30 knockouts, 10 decisions), 13 Losses  3 Draws
|-
|align=center style="border-style: none none solid solid; background: #e3e3e3"|Res.
|align=center style="border-style: none none solid solid; background: #e3e3e3"|Record
|align=center style="border-style: none none solid solid; background: #e3e3e3"|Opponent
|align=center style="border-style: none none solid solid; background: #e3e3e3"|Type
|align=center style="border-style: none none solid solid; background: #e3e3e3"|Rd., Time
|align=center style="border-style: none none solid solid; background: #e3e3e3"|Date
|align=center style="border-style: none none solid solid; background: #e3e3e3"|Location
|align=center style="border-style: none none solid solid; background: #e3e3e3"|Notes
|- align=center
|Loss
|40-13-3
|align=left| Ted Cheeseman
|
|
|
|align=left| 
|align=left|
|- align=center
|Loss
|40-12-3
|align=left| Antonio Margarito
|
|
|
|align=left|
|align=left|
|- align=center
|Win
|40-11-3
|align=left| Ben Hall
|
|
|
|align=left|
|align=left|
|- align=center
|Win
|39-11-3
|align=left| Starr Johnson
|
|
|
|align=left|
|align=left|
|- align=center
|Win
|38-11-3
|align=left| Mikel Williams
|
|
|
|align=left|
|align=left|
|- align=center
|Loss
|37-11-3
|align=left| Brian Rose
|
|
|
|align=left|
|align=left|
|- align=center
|- align=center
|Win
|37-10-3
|align=left| Brian Rose
|
|
|
|align=left|
|align=left|
|- align=center
|Win
|36-10-3
|align=left| Shannon Miller
|
|
|
|align=left| 
|align=left|
|- align=center
|Loss
|35-10-3
|align=left| Kell Brook
|
|
|
|align=left| 
|align=left|
|- align=center
|Win
|35-9-3
|align=left| Travis Hartman
|
|
|
|align=left| 
|align=left|
|-align=center
|style="background:#abcdef;"|Draw
|34-9-3
|align=left| Dean Byrne
|
|
|
|align=left| 
|align=left|
|-align=center
|-align=center
|Loss
|34-9-2
|align=left| Kell Brook
|
|
|
|align=left| 
|align=left|
|-align=center
|Win
|34-8-2
|align=left| Allen Conyers
|
|
|
|align=left| 
|align=left|
|-align=center

|Win
|33-8-2
|align=left| Ricardo Williams Jr.
|
|
|
|align=left| 
|align=left|
|-align=center

|Win
|32-8-2
|align=left| Said Ouali
|
|
|
|align=left| 
|align=left|
|-align=center

|Win
|31-8-2
|align=left| Germaine Sanders
|
|
|
|align=left| 
|align=left|
|-align=center

|Win
|30-8-2
|align=left| Michael Clark
|
|
|
|align=left| 
|align=left|
|-align=center

|Win
|29-8-2
|align=left| Rahman Yusubov
|
|
|
|align=left| 
|align=left|
|-align=center

|Win
|28-8-2
|align=left| Donovan Castaneda
|
|
|
|align=left| 
|align=left|
|-align=center

|Win
|27-8-2
|align=left| Roberto Valenzuela
|
|
|
|align=left| 
|align=left|
|-align=center

|Loss
|26-8-2
|align=left| Rogerio Pereira
|
|
|
|align=left| 
|align=left|
|-align=center

|Win
|26-7-2
|align=left| Jason LeHoullier
|
|
|
|align=left| 
|align=left|
|-align=center

|style="background:#abcdef;"|Draw
|25-7-2
|align=left| Delray Raines
|
|
|
|align=left| 
|align=left|
|-align=center

|Win
|25-7-1
|align=left| Eloy Suarez
|
|
|
|align=left| 
|align=left|
|-align=center

|Win
|24-7-1
|align=left| Tyrone Brunson
|
|
|
|align=left| 
|align=left|
|-align=center

|Win
|23-7-1
|align=left| Jose Adelaydo Gonzalez
|
|
|
|align=left| 
|align=left|
|-align=center

|style="background: #DDDDDD"| NC
|22-7-1
|align=left| Eloy Suarez
|
|
|
|align=left| 
|align=left|
|-align=center

|Win
|22-7-1
|align=left| Steve Walker
|
|
|
|align=left| 
|align=left|
|-align=center

|Win
|21-7-1
|align=left| Michi Munoz
|
|
|
|align=left| 
|align=left|
|-align=center

|Win
|20-7-1
|align=left| Dan Wallace
|
|
|
|align=left| 
|align=left|
|-align=center

|Win
|19-7-1
|align=left| Mike McGuire
|
|
|
|align=left| 
|align=left|
|-align=center

|Loss
|18-7-1
|align=left| Jesus Soto Karass
|
|
|
|align=left| 
|align=left|
|-align=center

|Win
|18-6-1
|align=left| Alexis Division
|
|
|
|align=left| 
|align=left|
|-align=center

|Win
|17-6-1
|align=left| Shaun Hinkle
|
|
|
|align=left| 
|align=left|
|-align=center

|Win||16-6-1||align=left| Donovan Castaneda
|
|
|
|align=left| 
|align=left|
|-align=center

|Win||15-6-1||align=left| John Huskey
|
|
|
|align=left| 
|align=left|
|-align=center

|Win ||14-6-1||align=left| Jose Adelaydo Gonzalez
|
|
|
|align=left| 
|align=left|
|-align=center

|Loss||13-6-1||align=left|Chris Gray
|||||
|align=left| 
|align=left|
|-align=center

|Win||13-5-1||align=left| Jose Adelaydo Gonzalez
|||||
|align=left| 
|align=left|
|-align=center

|Loss||12-5-1||align=left| Roberto Garcia
|||||
|align=left| 
|align=left|
|-align=center

|Loss||12-4-1||align=left| Freddy Hernández
|||||
|align=left| 
|align=left|
|-align=center

|Loss||12-3-1||align=left| Alfonso Gomez
|||||
|align=left| 
|align=left|
|-align=center

|Win||12-2-1||align=left| Justin Flanagan
|||||
|align=left| 
|align=left|
|-align=center

|Win||11-2-1||align=left| Jeff Carpenter
|||||
|align=left| 
|align=left|
|-align=center

|Win||10-2-1||align=left| Brad Hill
|||||
|align=left| 
|align=left|
|-align=center

|Win||9-2-1||align=left|  Adam Capo
|||||
|align=left| 
|align=left|
|-align=center

|Loss||8-2-1||align=left|  Luciano Perez
|||||
|align=left| 
|align=left|
|-align=center

|Win||8-1-1||align=left|  Julian Townsend
|||||
|align=left| 
|align=left|
|-align=center

|Win||7-1-1||align=left| Keon Johnson
|||||
|align=left| 
|align=left|
|-align=center

|Loss||6-1-1||align=left|  Favio Medina
|||||
|align=left| 
|align=left|
|-align=center

|Win||6-0-1||align=left| Verdell Smith
|||||
|align=left| 
|align=left|
|-align=center

|Win||5-0-1||align=left|  Donovan Castaneda
|||||
|align=left| 
|align=left|
|-align=center

| Win||4-0-1||align=left|  Larry Cunningham
|||||
|align=left| 
|align=left|
|-align=center

|style="background:#abcdef;"|Draw
||3-0-1||align=left| Favio Medina
|||||
|align=left| 
|align=left|
|-align=center

|style="background: #DDDDDD"| NC||3-0||align=left|  Kyle Sherman
|||||
|align=left| 
|align=left|
|-align=center

|Win||3-0||align=left|  Steve Vincent
|||||
|align=left| 
|align=left|
|-align=center

|Win||2-0||align=left|  David Molton
|||||
|align=left| 
|align=left|
|-align=center

|Win||1-0||align=left|  Sheldon Mosley
|||||
|align=left| 
|align=left|

References

External links
 

Living people
1986 births
American male boxers
Light-middleweight boxers
Welterweight boxers
Boxers from Oklahoma
Sportspeople from Oklahoma City